Mado is a township in Hwaseong, Gyeonggi Province, South Korea. Its population is 6,558 as of August 2015. Mado contains several villages.

Etymology
Mado (麻道) received its name during the early years of the Joseon Dynasty, when trade with China was active through the sea, when a Chinese envoy wore a hemp cloth and rode a boat from Haemun-ri, Mado-myeon to China.

History
At the end of the Joseon Dynasty, the Ssangsu and Mado townships, then part of Namyang County, were merged to become Mado Township. When the Japanese colonial administration's merged administrative districts on March 1, 1914 it became part of Suwon County. Later, when the town of Suwon was upgraded to city status in 1949, it became Mado Township, part of Hwaseong County.

On March 21, 2001, Mado Township became part of the City of Hwaseong when Hwaseong was upgraded from county to city status.

References

External links

Towns and townships in Gyeonggi Province
Hwaseong, Gyeonggi
1914 establishments in Korea